This is a list of actors who appeared in the Australian television program The Sullivans.

A
 Andy Anderson as Jim Sullivan
 Kerry Armstrong

B
 Vincent Ball as Admiral Spencer
 Lorraine Bayly as Grace Sullivan
 John Bowman as Constable Smith
 Don Bridges as 'Nervous' Nev Hollyoak
 Marcella Burgoyne as Lotte Kaufmann
 Simon Burke as Peter Robinson
 Annie Byron as Lou Sullivan

C
 Michael Caton as Harry Sullivan
 Anne Charleston
 Liddy Clark
 David Clencie as Steve Sullivan
 Chantal Contouri as Melina Baker
 Paul Cronin as Dave Sullivan

D
 Mercia Deane-Johns as Timna
 Myra De Groot as Laura Watkins
 Maggie Dence as Rose Sullivan
 Paula deBurgh
 Penny Downie as Patty Sullivan
 Gerry Duggan as Patrick Sullivan

G
 Mel Gibson as Ray Henderson
 Jaqui Gordon as Margery Fulton
 Reg Gorman as Jack Fletcher
 Vivean Gray as Ida Jessup

H
 Vicki Hammond as Maggie Baker
 Norman Hancock as Tom Edmunds (May 1981)
 Susan Hannaford as Kitty Sullivan
 Noni Hazlehurst as Lil Duggan
 Peter Hehir as Bert Duggan
 Damon Herriman as Frank Errol
 Jamie Higgins as Geoff Sullivan
 Robert Hughes

K
 Paul Karo as Reverend Roland
 Patricia Kennedy as Mother Bernadette
 Trevor Kent as Alister McConnell
 Jeremy Kewley as Alan Cochrane
 Patsy King as Beryl Fletcher

L
 Leon Lissek as Hans Kaufman
 Mark Little as Danny Wilson

M
 Des Mangan
 Tracy Mann 
 Ingrid Mason as Anna Kaufman
 Andrew McFarlane as John Sullivan
 Gus Mercurio
 Maggie Millar as Elizabeth Bradley
 Saskia Post as Carla #2
 Kylie Minogue as Carla #1 
 Richard Morgan as Terry Sullivan

N
 Sam Neill as Ben Dawson
 Charles Norman as Grandpa Sullivan

O
 Roger Oakley

P
 Fred Parslow as Mr Jarvis
 Fiona Paul as Maureen Sullivan
 Darius Perkins 
 Genevieve Picot as Caroline Sullivan

S
 Dion Segan
 Gary Sweet as Magpie Maddern

T
 Sigrid Thornton as Buffy Turnbull
 Steven Tandy as Tom Sullivan

W

 Nick Waters as Horace ' Horrible' Brown
 Megan Williams as Alice Sullivan
Gary Waddell as 'Spook'Skerrington

Y
 Norman Yemm as Norm Baker

References

Sullivans
Sullivans